The Samuelson condition, authored by Paul Samuelson, in the theory of public goods in economics, is a condition for the efficient provision of public goods.  When satisfied, the Samuelson condition implies that further substituting public for private goods (or vice versa) would result in a decrease of social utility.

For an economy with n consumers the conditions reads as follows:

MRSi is individual i marginal rate of substitution and MRT is the economy's marginal rate of transformation between the public good and an arbitrarily chosen private good.

If the private good is a numeraire good then the Samuelson condition can be re-written as:

where  is the marginal benefit to each person of consuming one more unit of the public good, and MC is the marginal cost of providing that good. In other words, the public good should be provided as long as the overall benefits to consumers from that good are at least as great as the cost of providing it. (Remember that public goods are non-rival, so can be enjoyed by many consumers simultaneously). 

When written this way, the Samuelson condition has a simple graphic interpretation. Each individual consumer's marginal benefit, represents his or her demand for the public good, or willingness to pay. The sum of the marginal benefits represent the aggregate willingness to pay or aggregate demand. The marginal cost is, under competitive market conditions, the supply for public goods. 

Hence the Samuelson condition can be thought of as a generalization of supply and demand concepts from private to public goods.

See also
Lindahl equilibrium

References

Brümmerhoff, Dieter (2001), Finanzwissenschaft, München u.a.O.

Market failure